Kommos is a Greek prehistoric Bronze Age port and archaeological site in southern Crete, 5 km north of Matala. It was a busy port with connections to the Near East that continued into historic periods; the rich finds and elaborate buildings reflect the importance of foreign trade for the Cretan economy. Its ancient name was probably Amyklaion, which would reflect a link with Amyclae; Robin Lane Fox speculates that it is referred to in Odyssey 3.296: "a small rock holds back the great waves." That small rock is likely to have been the natural reef of Papadoplaka and a submerged sandy shore stretching to the coast would have formed a natural harbor. This breakwater was partially degraded by aerial bombing during the Second World War as part of a campaign to deny safe harbours for the Nazis' enemies.

Kommos was the harbour firstly for the nearby larger ruined Minoan settlement and palace of Phaistos, which was one of the principal cultural centres of Minoan Crete, then for its successor Hagia Triada in the Late Minoan period.

Archaeology

The site first attracted the attention of archaeologists in 1924, when Arthur Evans heard about large storage vessels found there and speculated about the existence of a Bronze Age "customs house"; excavations have been carried on by J.W. and Maria Shaw since 1976.

The site does not conform to the traditional "Palatial" style of the Minoans.  Built atop the ruins of a smaller Stone Age settlement, the structure the site contains a single upscale (though far from royal) dwelling attached to the site, six respectably sized dwellings on the hillside to the North and a warren of stone rooms atop the hill of a community of farmers/fishermen.

Though its original use is debated, the site was abandoned several times over its lifetime.  During such periods, parts of the site were used as a pottery studio with a large kiln still in evidence.   This is a (so far) unique survival of an abandoned Minoan kiln complete with its "wasters" (malformed pots), and is developing understanding of the details of production of Minoan pottery.<ref>[https://tspace.library.utoronto.ca/bitstream/1807/3306/1/Suppl30.pdf#search=%22Crete%20%22Fine%20Gray%20Ware%22%22 A LM IA Ceramic Kiln in South-Central Crete], Joseph W. Shaw et al., Hesperia Supplement 30, 2001.</ref>

The "Palace's" final incarnation saw the main courtyard converted into "ship sheds" by knocking down the seaside wall and building long narrow rooms open on one end. A paved section of road passing through the site, roads being difficult and expensive propositions at the time, along with the conversion to ship sheds suggests the use of the site as a harbour and customs house by a larger settlement.  This is further supported by the relatively large scale of the project when compared to the supply of labour from the small village adjacent.  The Bronze Age use of the site corresponds roughly with the power fluctuations of the important nearby Palace of Phaistos, though it may merely represent the fluctuations in the population of the Mesara Plain as a whole.

 Sanctuary and evidence of Cult 
The function of most of the buildings in Kommos is not clear. However, archaeologists have found out that some of the foundations belonged to a sanctuary, that was used intermittently by the Minoans and later taken over by the Greeks. It was definitively abandoned at the end of the Hellenistic age. It is worth mentioning that the most ancient evidence of a place of cult in Kommos is regarded to be the so-called Temple A, a small rural shrine, founded in the end of XI century B.C.. It was then replaced by a building, Temple B, characterized by the presence of an outdoor altar, constructed on the same site. The latest Minoan temple was Temple C, a more ambitious construction, started around 750 B.C.

In the whole sanctuary area was found a thick layer of burned strata, with many offerings, especially aryballoi and cups, suggesting rituals and ritual meals being held there frequently.

 Ancient flora and fauna 
Kommos' flora remains consistent with the flora of Crete. Yet the site has yielded many animal remains, a majority of which were excavated from archaic vessels and pottery.

Excavations carried out between 1976 and 1985 yielded 9,400 large mammal bones, 150 Rodentia bones, 1,150 fish bones, and around 36,000 marine invertebrate. Of these samples a large number were attributed to pigs. Remains found revealed a variety of butchery methods performed, including partial opening of the skull assumedly for consumption of the brain. Further animal remains, such as cows and deer were also found around the site. Very few human remains have been uncovered from the site, with the only human remain being an adult mandible.

Bird remains have also been found. Eggshells and avian bones from the site were identified by Dr. George E. Watson, Curator of Birds at the Smithsonian Institution. The usage for birds varied from domestication to consumption. Avian bones found at the site include Woodpigeon, Rock Dove, Turtle Dove, Scopoli's Shearwater, and Chukar Partridge.

 Evidence of Trade 
Kommos has yielded more evidence for intercultural trade in the form of imported ceramics than any other Bronze Age site in the Aegean. Archaeologists have found Egyptian figurines and transport jars, Canaanite jars, and jars that originated from the Nile Delta. The typical transport vessel found in the Late Bronze Age Southern Aegean is the transport stirrup-jar, which looks like a larger false-necked amphora. It has a wide-mouth rim with two vertical handles on the shoulders that connect to the neck of the vessel. At the beginning of the 14th century BC, a variation of the Minoan oval-mouthed amphora started making an appearance in Kommos. Dubbed the short-neck amphora, this vessel had two cylindrical handles attached at the shoulder, a stunted neck, and a round mouth. On the Syro-Palestinian coast, the Canaanite jar was the preferred transport jar; it was widely exported to Cyprus and Lower Egypt, where they eventually adopted and imitated the shoulder-handled vessel. The variations of the Canaanite jar created in Egypt can easily be identified by the diversities in material and surface treatment.

	Thousands of ceramic sherds have been recovered from the Late Minoan city of Kommos. Transport stirrup jars have not only been found on Crete but also in vast quantities on the Greek mainland, throughout the Aegean Islands, and along the western Anatolian coast. The Cretan vessels have been found in the Egyptian city of Tell el-Amarna, Cyprus, and the Levant, and the results of petrographic and trace element analysis determine that the majority of these transport stirrup jars originated in the northern part of Central Crete. While the transport stirrup jar was frequently used in Crete to ferry their goods, the Canaanite jar was the preferred container throughout the Levant. Evidence of the Canaanite jar has been found at Kommos in the form of 60 fragmentary to fully restorable containers. The final type of vessel identified is the Egyptian jar. Kommos has been the only Aegean site where this Late Bronze Age undecorated pottery has been recovered. The styles of pottery range from closed shapes to amphoras, flasks, and necked jars, and most likely transported wine. The presence of Canaanite jars and Egyptian jars at Kommos and Cretan transport stirrup jars found throughout the Aegean islands, Egypt, and the Anatolian coast confirms the importance of international trade to the Late Minoan coastal city of Kommos.

 Notes 
Today the Kommos archaeological site is not open to the public. It is only possible to see part of the excavation while walking to the nearby beach.

See also

Asterousia Mountains
Hagia Triada

References

 Further reading 
 Shaw, Joseph W. "Excavations at Kommos (Crete) during 1979." Hesperia 49.3 (Jul.-Sep. 1980): 207–250. Plates 53 - 67 (pp. 45 – 59.).
 Shaw, Joseph W. "Kommos in Southern Crete: an Aegean barometer for east-west interconnections." In Eastern Mediterranean: Cyprus-Dodecanese-Crete, 16th-6th cent. B.C., Rethymnon Conference of May 1996, Athens, 1998: 13–27. (Editors: Vassos Karageorghis and Nikolaos Stampolidis).
 Watrous, L. Vance. "Late Bronze Age Kommos: imported pottery as evidence for foreign contact." Scripta Mediterranea VI (1985): 1–10.

External links
 Kommos Excavation Crete (archeological introduction).
 Kommos Conservancy (Conservation Development and Education).
 Minoan Crete website: Kommos page
 Joseph W. Shaw archival papers held at the University of Toronto Archives and Records Management Services
 Amyklaion? (the archaeological site of Kommos) in the Pleiades Gazetteer

Bibliography
Joseph W. Shaw, Kommos: A Minoan Harbor Town and Greek Sanctuary in Southern Crete'' (ASCSA,).
 A Bibliographical Guide to the Kommos site by Joseph W. Shaw (pdf; HTML cache)

Peter M. Day, Patrick S. Quinn, Jeremy B. Rutter, & Vassilis Kilikoglou. (2011). A WORLD OF GOODS: Transport Jars and Commodity Exchange at the Late Bronze Age Harbor of Kommos, Crete. Hesperia: The Journal of the American School of Classical Studies at Athens, 80(4), 511–558. 
 https://www.jstor.org/stable/10.2972/hesperia.80.4.0511

Minoan sites in Crete
Port settlements in ancient Crete
Former populated places in Greece